Neasura is a genus of moths in the subfamily Arctiinae. The genus was first described by George Hampson in 1900.

Some species are:
Neasura apicalis (Walker, 1854)
Neasura buruana van Eecke 1929
Neasura circumducta Pagenstecher 1900
Neasura gyochiana Matsumura 1927
Neasura hypophaeola Hampson, 1900
Neasura nigroanalis Matsumura 1927
Neasura pellucida de Joannis 1928
Neasura rufescens Rothschild 1912
Neasura taprobana Hampson, 1907

References

EOL.org

Lithosiini
Moth genera